Higbee Street School is located in Trenton, Mercer County, New Jersey, United States. The building was built in 1857 and was added to the National Register of Historic Places on April 14, 1995.

See also
National Register of Historic Places listings in Mercer County, New Jersey

References

Buildings and structures in Trenton, New Jersey
National Register of Historic Places in Trenton, New Jersey
School buildings completed in 1857
School buildings on the National Register of Historic Places in New Jersey
New Jersey Register of Historic Places
1857 establishments in New Jersey